Volta a Portugal do Futuro is a road bicycle race held annually in Portugal. It has been organized as a 2.2U event on the UCI Europe Tour since 2014.

Winners

References

UCI Europe Tour races
Cycle races in Portugal
Recurring sporting events established in 2014
2014 establishments in Portugal
Summer events in Portugal